Ephraim Nwuzi is a Rivers State politician who once served as the Commissioner of Employment Generation and Empowerment. During the 2019 general election, he contested under the platform of The Peoples' Democratic Party and won a seat at The Federal House of Representatives He is a member of the Rivers State People's Democratic Party. He is a former chairman of Etche Local Government Council.

In 2011, he was conferred the title of Ekwueme 1 of Etche by the Etche Supreme Council of Traditional Rulers.

References

Living people
First Wike Executive Council
Commissioners of ministries of Rivers State
People from Etche
Rivers State Peoples Democratic Party politicians
Mayors of places in Rivers State
Year of birth missing (living people)